Nahid Persson Sarvestani (born 24 May 1960) is a Swedish-Iranian documentary filmmaker.

Her most famous documentary films are Prostitution Behind the Veil, My Mother – A Persian Princess, The End of Exile, and The Last Days of Life. In 2007, after having been arrested and briefly imprisoned by the authorities in Iran for allegedly having shamed her native country with her documentary on two prostitutes in Tehran, she completed the documentary Four Wives - One Man under dangerous conditions. The film which portrays a polygamous family south of Shiraz, was smuggled out of Iran and finally edited in Sweden. As of November 2008, Persson Sarvestani recently finished the production of The Queen and I, a 90-minute documentary in which the director's year-long, complex relationship with the Iranian former Empress Farah Pahlavi is examined. The film had its North American premiere at Sundance Film Festival in 2009 and is under worldwide release in conjunction with the 30-year anniversary of the Islamic Revolution in 2009.

Persson Sarvestani has received several awards for her films. The Last Days of Life received the Swedish Cancer Foundation's (Cancerfondens) Journalist Prize in 2002. The film Prostitution Behind The Veil, a controversial and painfully revealing account of the lives of two prostitutes in Tehran, received an International Emmy nomination, as well as the Golden Dragon at the Kraków Film Festival, Best International News Documentary at the TV-festival 2005 in Monte Carlo, as well as The Crystal Award (Kristallen) by SVT (Swedish public broadcasting television) and the Golden Scarab (Guldbaggen) by the Swedish Film Institute in 2005.

Persson Sarvestani also shares TCO's (Tjänstemännens Centralorganisation) 2005 Cultural Prize with the author Marjaneh Bakhtiari.

References

External links
 Production company web site

 Four Wives One Man at Women Make Movies

1960 births
Living people
Iranian documentary filmmakers
Swedish documentary filmmakers
People from Shiraz
Sommar (radio program) hosts
Iranian emigrants to Sweden